Hystrix-like ichthyosis–deafness syndrome (also known as "HID syndrome") is a cutaneous condition characterized by a keratoderma.

See also 
 KID syndrome
 List of cutaneous conditions

References

External links 

Palmoplantar keratodermas
Syndromes